Bibimys labiosus), also known as the large-lipped crimson-nosed rat is a species of rodent in the family Cricetidae.
It is found in Brazil and Argentina.

References

Bibimys
Mammals described in 1887
Taxa named by Herluf Winge